Euthalia monina, the powdered baron or Malay baron, is a species of nymphalid butterfly. The species was first described by Frederic Moore in 1859.

Subspecies
E. m. monina (Peninsular Malaya, Singapore, Langkawi) – Malay baron
E. m. insularis Eliot, 1978 – (Peninsular Malaysia)
E. m. kesava (Moore, 1859) (Sikkim to Assam, Myanmar, southern Yunnan) – powdered baron
E. m. discipilota Moore, 1878 – (northern Myanmar)
E. m. remias Corbet – (central Myanmar to Thailand)
E. m. varius Tsukada, 1991
E. m. grahami Riley & Godfrey, 1921 – (Peninsular Thailand)
E. m. sastra Fruhstorfer – (Indochina)
E. m. tudela Fruhstorfer – (southern China, Hainan)
E. m. erana de Nicéville – (Sumatra, Batu Islands)
E. m. cordata Weymer, 1887 – (Nias Island)
E. m. ilka Fruhstorfer, 1899 – (northern Borneo)
E. m. natuna Fruhstorfer, 1906 – (Natuna Islands)
E. m. indras Vollenhoven – (southern Borneo)
E. m. salia (Moore, 1857) – (Java)
E. m. tanagra Staudinger – (Palawan)
E. m. suluana Fruhstorfer, 1902 – (Sulu Island)
E. m. sramana Fruhstorfer, 1913 – (Bali)
E. m. obsoleta Fruhstorfer, 1897 – (Lombok)
E. m. jiwabaruana Eliot, 1980 – (Mentawai Islands)

Several forms are described for subspecies monina, including form monina, decorata (Butler, 1869) and gardineri (Fruhstorfer, 1906).

Description
The males of Euthalia monina have blackish or dark brown wings, with a blue-green iridescence on the outer part. The wings of the females are dark brown with pale greyish markings.

Biology
Known host plants of the caterpillars include: Clidemia hirta (Melastomataceae), Diospyros melanoxylon (Ebenaceae), Macaranga hullettii, Mallotus subpeltatus (Euphorbiaceae), and Shorea robusta (Dipterocarpaceae).

Distribution and habitat
This species can be found in Asia, mainly in Borneo, Sumatra, Java, Peninsular Malaya, Sikkim - Assam, Myanmar, Cambodia and Thailand.

References

M
Butterflies of Asia
Butterflies of Indochina
Butterflies of Borneo
Butterflies of Indonesia
Butterflies of Java
Butterflies of Malaysia
Butterflies of Singapore
Lepidoptera of Thailand
Butterflies described in 1859